Vasyl Vasylyovych Lytvynenko (born 3 October 1991) is a Ukrainian professional footballer who plays as a goalkeeper for Polish club Widzew Łódź.

References

External links
 
 
 

1991 births
Living people
People from Kyiv Oblast
Ukrainian footballers
Association football goalkeepers
FC Dynamo Khmelnytskyi players
FC Kolos Kovalivka players
FC Obolon-2 Kyiv players
FC Obolon-Brovar Kyiv players
Widzew Łódź players
Ukrainian First League players
Ukrainian Second League players
Ukrainian Amateur Football Championship players
Ukrainian expatriate footballers
Expatriate footballers in Poland
Ukrainian expatriate sportspeople in Poland